Mount Edgell is a mountain,  high, rising eastward of Cape Jeremy, the east side of the north entrance to George VI Sound, on the west coast of the Antarctic Peninsula. It was discovered by the French Antarctic Expedition of 1908–10 under Jean-Baptiste Charcot. Charcot saw it first from a great distance and thinking it to be an island, he named it "Ile Gordon Bennett" for James Gordon Bennett, Jr. of the New York Herald, who gave financial aid to the expedition. The British Graham Land Expedition under John Rymill, surveying this area in 1936–37 and finding no island, applied the name Mount Edgell to the feature now recognized as Charcot's "Ile Gordon Bennett." The name Mount Edgell, after Sir John Augustine Edgell, Hydrographer of the Navy from 1932–45, has since become established through international usage.

See also
Pampero Pass

Further reading 
 Leat, Philip T.; Scarrow, Jane H. 1994, Central volcanoes as sources for the Antarctic Peninsula Volcanic Group, Antarctic Science, 6 (3). https://doi.org/10.1017/S0954102094000568
 United States. Defense Mapping Agency. Hydrographic Center, Sailing Directions for Antarctica: Includes Islands South of Latitude 60°, P 204

External links 

 Mount Edgell on USGS website
 Mount Edgell on SCAR website
 Mount Edgell on peakery.com

References 

Mountains of Graham Land
Fallières Coast